The 2015 GT Asia Series was the sixth season of the GT Asia Series championship. It began on 16 May at the Korea International Circuit and ended on 2 November at the Guia Circuit after 11 championship races and a non-championship event.

The series will change tyre supplier from Yokohama to Michelin.

Entry list

Race calendar and results
The full calendar for the 2015 season was released on 28 February 2015. The Sepang International Circuit round will be a 3-hour endurance race and held at Saturday.

Championship standings
Scoring system

Drivers' championship (overall)

References

External links

GT Asia Series seasons
GT Asia Series
GT Asia Series